John IV (15 October 1396 – 5 November 1450) was a Count of Armagnac, Fézensac, and Rodez from 1418 to 1450. He was involved in the intrigues related to the Hundred Years' War and in conflicts against the King of France.

Biography
Born 15 October 1396, John was the son of Bernard VII of Armagnac, Count d' Armagnac, of Fézensac, Pardiac, and Rodez; and Bonne of Berry. Upon the murder of his father on 12 June 1418 by a mob, John became count of Armagnac.

John's father had taken the County of Comminges by force, but John could not prevent the second marriage of Marguerite to Mathieu de Foix in 1419. Subsequently, they retook the County of Comminges. 

In 1425, John recognized the King of Castile as overlord of Armagnac. The French king, Charles VII, occupied fighting the English, could not intervene, but did not overlook the affront. His conflict with Charles VII encouraged him to seek an approximation with the latter's enemies, namely the English. In July 1437, both John and King Henry VI of England signed a treaty, one of the terms being that Armagnac would not allow his subjects to act with hostility towards the English.

John took part in the Praguerie (1440) of the barons and the Dauphin of France, but the coalition was overcome by Charles VII, who pardoned the insurrectionists.

John started negotiations for a marriage between one of his daughters and Henry VI of England in 1442. John was anxious for a strong alliance which would protect him from threats by Charles VII, while the English were looking forward to being able to use his lands as a defensive buffer zone against French attacks. His strategically located territories in southwestern France made him much better positioned to defend Gascony than the English crown. "...the count of Armagnac was said to have offered a huge dowry in money, lands and men to help defend the borders of Gascony." John seems to have stalled the negotiations as he evaluated whether allying with the English or attempting a reconciliation with Charles VII was the best idea. Regardless, threats from his overlord, coupled with indecisiveness on the part of the English, the marriage negotiations came to an end.

John, besieged in L'Isle-Jourdain by Dauphin Louis, was captured and imprisoned in Carcassonne in 1444. He was pardoned three years later, but his counties were directed by royal officers.

Marriages and children
John married Blanche of Brittany (1395–1419), daughter of John IV, Duke of Brittany and Jeanne d' Évreux, on 16 June 1407 and had:
Bonne (b. 1416; † before 1448)

He married his second wife on 10 May 1419, shortly after the death of his first wife. His second wife was Isabella d' Évreux (b. 1395; † 1450), daughter of Charles III, king of Navarre and Eleanor of Castille.
They had:
 Marie of Armagnac (b. 1420; † 1473), married in 1437 John II of Alençon (1409–1476), Duke of Alençon
 Jean V of Armagnac (b. 1420; † 1473), Viscount of Lomagne, then Count of Armagnac, of Fézensac and Rodez.
Eléonore (b. 1423; † 1456), married in 1446 Louis II of Chalon-Arlay (b. 1389; † 1463), Prince d'Orange, Lord of Arlay and Arguel
 Charles I, Count of Armagnac (b. 1425; † 1497), Viscount of Fézensaguet, then Count d' Armagnac, of Fézensac and Rodez
 Isabelle (c. 1430 – 1476), Lady of the Four-Valleys

Notes

References

Sources

Further reading

External links
 Maison d'Armagnac (in French)

People from Rodez
1396 births
1450 deaths
Counts of Armagnac